The New York Islanders are an American professional ice hockey team based in Uniondale, New York. They are members of the Metropolitan Division of the Eastern Conference in the National Hockey League (NHL). The Islanders arrived in Uniondale in 1972, and play their home games at UBS Arena.

The franchise, and its members, have won numerous team and individual awards and honors. The team won the Clarence S. Campbell Bowl trophy for having the best regular-season record in the Campbell Conference in 1978, 1979 and 1981. Following league realignment in 1981, they then captured the Prince of Wales Trophy as the Wales Conference playoff champion consecutively from 1982 to 1984. The Islanders won the Stanley Cup four consecutive years from 1980 to 1983. Denis Potvin, Bryan Trottier and Mike Bossy have won at least four awards, with all three winning the Calder Memorial Trophy as rookie of the year in their first NHL seasons. They also won other various awards, such as the Art Ross, James Norris Memorial and Lady Byng Memorial trophies. All three players earned selections to the First and Second All-Star teams numerous times. Mike Bossy played in seven All-Star Games, the most in Islanders history.

Eight players have had their numbers retired by the Islanders: 5 (Denis Potvin), 9 (Clark Gillies), 19 (Bryan Trottier), 22 (Mike Bossy), 23 (Bob Nystrom), 27 (John Tonelli), 31 (Billy Smith) and 91 (Butch Goring). Of them, five players have been elected to the Hockey Hall of Fame: Denis Potvin, Bryan Trottier, Mike Bossy, Billy Smith and Clark Gillies. Other management personnel who have been inducted include Al Arbour, who coached the Islanders from 1972 to 1986 and 1988 to 1994, and Bill Torrey, who held the general manager position from 1972 to 1992.

League awards

Team trophies
The New York Islanders have won the Prince of Wales Trophy and Clarence S. Campbell Bowl three times each and the Stanley Cup four consecutive times, from 1980 to 1983. The Islanders have never won the Presidents' Trophy which has been given to the team finishing the regular season with the best overall record based on points since the 1985–86 season. Prior to the creation of the trophy the Islanders led the league in points three times for the 1978–79, 1980–81, and 1981–82 seasons.

Individual awards
Bryan Trottier, Denis Potvin and Mike Bossy have won four or five individual awards each. In 1978–79, Trottier led the NHL with 47 goals and 134 points, earning him the Art Ross Trophy and a spot on the NHL first All-Star team. Trottier also received the Hart Memorial Trophy for being the most valuable player during the 1978–79 regular season. In the 1975–76, 1977–78, and 1978–79 regular seasons, Potvin was awarded the James Norris Memorial Trophy as the best defense player in the league. Bossy is a three-time winner of the Lady Byng Memorial Trophy, an award given for gentlemanly conduct during the regular season. All three have won the Calder Memorial Trophy once, and have been on the NHL first All-Star team at least twice. Trottier and Bossy have both won the Conn Smythe Trophy once, which is awarded to the most valuable player of the playoffs.

All-Stars

NHL first and second team All-Stars
The NHL first and second team All-Stars are the top players at each position as voted on by the Professional Hockey Writers' Association.

NHL All-Rookie Team
The NHL All-Rookie Team consists of the top rookies at each position as voted on by the Professional Hockey Writers' Association.

All-Star Game selections
The National Hockey League All-Star Game is a mid-season exhibition game held annually between many of the top players of each season. Thirty-nine All-Star Games have been held since the Islanders entered the league in 1972, with at least one player chosen to represent the Islanders in each year except 2001 and 2011. The All-Star game has not been held in various years: 1979 and 1987 due to the 1979 Challenge Cup and Rendez-vous '87 series between the NHL and the Soviet national team, respectively, 1995, 2005, and 2013 as a result of labor stoppages, 2006, 2010, and 2014 because of the Winter Olympic Games, and 2021 as a result of the COVID-19 pandemic. Denis Potvin played a franchise-high nine All-Star Games as a member of the Islanders. The Islanders have hosted one of the games. The 35th took place at Nassau Veterans Memorial Coliseum.

 Selected by fan vote
 All-Star Game Most Valuable Player

All-Star Game replacement events
 Selected by fan vote

Career achievements

Hockey Hall of Fame
Several members of the Islanders organization have been honored by the Hockey Hall of Fame. Denis Potvin and Mike Bossy were the first Islander players inducted, gaining election in 1991. Potvin recorded 310 goals in 1060 games for the Islanders, and Bossy recorded 573 goals in 752 games. They were joined in 1993 by a fellow member of the 1980–83 Stanley Cup championship teams, Billy Smith. Smith spent 17 seasons with the Islanders, recording 305 wins and capturing the Vezina Trophy and the William M. Jennings Trophy once each. Bryan Trottier, elected in 1997, became the fourth former Islanders player to enter the Hall of Fame. Trottier played 15 seasons on Long Island and recorded 500 goals in 1123 games. In 2002, Clark Gillies became the fifth former Islander inducted into the Hall; Gillies was a member of the Islanders from 1974 to 1986.

Two members of team management have been inducted in the "Builders" category. Former head coach Al Arbour gained election as a builder in 1996, having coached the Islanders to four Stanley Cup victories. Arbour coached 20 seasons with the Islanders from 1973 to 1986, and 1988–94, and his 740 wins in 1500 games are a team record. Bill Torrey was the Islanders' general manager from the organization's first year in 1972 to 1992. During that period, the Islanders qualified for the playoffs 14 consecutive times between 1975 and 1988, including an additional time in 1990. Torrey was inducted in 1995.

Foster Hewitt Memorial Award
One member of the Islanders organization has been honored with the Foster Hewitt Memorial Award. The award is presented by the Hockey Hall of Fame to members of the radio and television industry who make outstanding contributions to their profession and the game of ice hockey during their broadcasting career.

Lester Patrick Trophy
Four members of the Islanders organization have been honored with the Lester Patrick Trophy. The trophy has been presented by the National Hockey League and USA Hockey since 1966 to honor a recipient's contribution to ice hockey in the United States. This list includes all personnel who have ever been employed by the New York Islanders in any capacity and have also received the Lester Patrick Trophy.

United States Hockey Hall of Fame

Retired numbers

The New York Islanders have retired eight numbers, which means that no player can use those jersey numbers again while part of the team. Of the eight players whose numbers were retired, five have been inducted into the Hockey Hall of Fame. In addition to the numbers, two additional banners are raised at Nassau Veterans Memorial Coliseum. One of these is for Al Arbour, who was the Islanders head coach for 19 seasons. The number on Arbour's banner is 1500, which represents the number of games Arbour has coached. Another banner is for Bill Torrey, who was the general manager of the Islanders from 1972 to 1992. In place of a number, his banner features a bow tie (his unofficial trademark) and the words "The Architect". Also out of circulation is the number 99 which was retired league-wide for Wayne Gretzky on February 6, 2000. Gretzky did not play for the Islanders during his 20-year NHL career and no Islanders player had ever worn the number 99 prior to its retirement.

New York Islanders Hall of Fame
The New York Islanders Hall of Fame was established in 2006. Individuals who had their number retired or had a banner hanging from the rafters prior to 2006 gained automatic induction.

Team awards

Bob Nystrom Award
The Bob Nystrom Award is an Islanders team award given each year to the player who "best exemplifies leadership, hustle and dedication." It was first awarded in 1991, and is named after Islanders' Hall of Famer, Bob Nystrom.

Notes

References
General
 

Specific

External links
 }

New York Islanders
award winners